Pipilo is a genus of birds in the American sparrow family Passerellidae. It is one of two genera containing birds with the common name towhee.

Taxonomy
The genus Pipilo was introduced by the French ornithologist Louis Jean Pierre Vieillot in 1816 with the eastern towhee as the type species. The name Pipilo is New Latin for "bunting" from pipilare "to chirp". Within the New World sparrow family Passerellidae, the genus Pipilo is sister to the larger genus Atlapetes.

Species
The genus contains five species:

References

External links
 
 
Towhee videos, photos and sounds on the Internet Bird Collection

 
Bird genera
American sparrows
Taxa named by Louis Jean Pierre Vieillot